Park Min-ji (born July 22, 1989) is a South Korean actress.

Filmography

Film

Television series

References

External links

1989 births
Living people
South Korean child actresses
21st-century South Korean actresses
South Korean film actresses
South Korean television actresses